Underwater Love may refer to:

 a 1997 hit by English band Smoke city, see Underwater Love (Smoke City song)

a 2011 Japanese-German movie about a woman and a sea creature, see Underwater Love (film)
a track from the 1989 album The Real Thing by US band Faith No More